Séamus Hennessy (born 1956) is an Irish former hurler. At club level he played with Kilruane MacDonaghs and was also a member of the Tipperary senior hurling team.

Career

Hennessy first played hurling at juvenile and underage levels with the Kilruane MacDonaghs. He is the only player to have lined out in six consecutive divisional udner-21 finals and is one of only a handful of players to have won four consecutive Tipperary U21AHC titles with the club from 1973 to 1976. Hennessy was the youngest ever Kilruane player to line out in a North Tipperary SHC final when he did so as a 17-year-old in 1973. He came on as a substitute for Enda Hogan at midfield when Kilruane MacDonaghs won the All-Ireland Club Championship title in 1986

Hennessy first appeared on the inter-county scene during a two-year tenure with the Tipperary minor hurling team. He also spent two seasons with the under-21 team, however, his underage career ended without success. Hennessy's performances at club level earned his inclusion on the senior team for the 1979 Munster SHC campaign.

Personal life

His son, also called Séamus Hennessy, was part of the Tipperary team that won the All-Ireland SHC title in 2010.

Honours

Kilruane MacDonaghs
All-Ireland Senior Club Hurling Championship: 1986
Munster Senior Club Hurling Championship: 1985
Tipperary Senior Hurling Championship: 1977, 1978, 1979, 1985
North Tipperary Senior Hurling Championship: 1977, 1978, 1979, 1985, 1986, 1987
Tipperary Under-21 A Hurling Championship: 1973, 1974, 1975, 1976

References

External link

 Séamus Hennessy player profile

1956 births
Living people
Kilruane MacDonaghs hurlers
Tipperary inter-county hurlers